Summerlands is a locality and a former residential subdivision on Phillip Island in Victoria, Australia, located in the south-west corner of the island, close to a little penguin breeding colony. In 1985, the Victorian government decided that, to protect the penguin rookery, further development of the subdivision would be prohibited and all the properties would be progressively purchased by the state.

History
In the early 20th century, the Summerland Peninsula had remained relatively untouched by European settlement compared to the rest of the island. Although chicory, mustard and oats for horse fodder were grown there, the land was of minimal pastoral or agricultural value. As a result, the penguin colony there survived while others on the island did not.

Subdivision of the area was carried out from the 1920s until the 1960s. The first subdivision consisted of 12 large allotments, along with features such as a roundabout and cypress trees that were still visible decades later. Between 1927 and 1931, 227 new blocks were created, and from 1929 to 1940 there was a nine-hole golf course on what is now the Penguin Parade car park.

In the 1950s, a further 437 blocks were created, and the final subdivisions were carried out in 1958 and 1961 on land closer to The Nobbies. Much of the land was sold to speculators rather than those interested in building on it, and by 1974 only 11 percent of the 986 blocks of land had been cleared or built on.

Land buyback
Progressive residential development on the Summerland Estate was considered a threat to the survival of the penguin colony. The 1989 Phillip Island Penguin Reserve Management Plan called the estate "a major blight on the landscape". In the early 1970s, the local shire had started to buy back land on the estate.

In 1985, the Victorian government announced that it would purchase all 774 allotments on the Summerland Peninsula to protect the penguin colony, setting up the "Summerland Estate Buy-Back Programme". The programme had a projected end date of 2000, with the land to be added to the Phillip Island Nature Park. During this period, land owners could not build on their land, improve their properties, or sell them to anyone but the Government. By 2007, 732 properties had been voluntarily sold by their owners, at a cost to the government of around a million dollars a year.

The buyback process was finalised in 2007, with the compulsorily acquisition of the final 42 properties (20 empty blocks and 22 with houses, held by 34 private owners) to take place over the next three years, at a cost of $15 million. In 2008, five property purchases were settled and agreement to purchase one property was reached, along with six negotiated purchase offers and one offer for compulsory acquisition. In 2008-09, 14 properties were purchased, taking the total number to 25 and leaving 17 properties still to be acquired.

In June 2010, the government announced that the buy-back programme had been completed, and the land involved was in the process of being added to the Phillip Island Nature Park and revegetated. A few scattered houses remained on the subdivision.

References

External links
Summerlands on VICNAMES database

Phillip Island
Resumed localities in Australia
Towns in Victoria (Australia)
Bass Coast Shire